Schwiedelbrouch is a village in the commune of Rambrouch, in the Diekirch District, and the canton of Redange, in western Luxembourg. (Historically it was in the commune of Folschette.)  , the village has a population of 80.

Rambrouch
Villages in Luxembourg